The CNNA HL-3 was a civil trainer aircraft developed in Brazil in 1941.

Development
CNNA had already benefited from the Brazilian government's decision to invest in a pilot training campaign and hoped that a dedicated trainer aircraft would attract even more sales.  To that end, the HL-3 was proposed, and one prototype was constructed and flown.  Unfortunately for the firm, this was not to be the case, and no official interest was shown.

The HL-3 was a two-place light aircraft powered by a  horizontally-opposed four-cylinder piston engine.

An improved version with a more powerful  engine was designated the CNNA HL-4, but this didn't sell either.

References

Further reading

External links
 

HL-3
1940s Brazilian civil trainer aircraft
High-wing aircraft
Single-engined tractor aircraft